This is a list of virtual reality headsets, which are head-mounted displays used to present virtual reality environments.

There are two primary categories of VR devices:

 Standalone devices that have all necessary components to provide virtual reality experiences integrated into the headset. Mainstream standalone VR platforms include:
 Oculus Mobile SDK, developed by Oculus VR for its own standalone headsets and the Samsung Gear VR. (The SDK has been deprecated in favor of OpenXR, released in July 2021.)
 Tethered headsets that act as a display device to another device, like a PC or a video game console, to provide a virtual reality experience. Mainstream tethered VR platforms include:
 SteamVR, part of the Steam service by Valve. The SteamVR platform uses the OpenVR SDK to support headsets from multiple manufacturers, including HTC, Windows Mixed Reality headset manufacturers, and Valve themselves. A list of supported video games can be found here.
 Oculus PC SDK for Oculus Rift and Oculus Rift S. The list of supported games is here.
 Windows Mixed Reality (also referred to as "Windows MR" or "WMR"), developed by Microsoft Corporation for Windows 10 PCs.
 PlayStation VR, developed by Sony Computer Entertainment for use with PlayStation 4 and Playstation 5 (PlayStation VR2) home video game console.
 Open Source Virtual Reality (also referred to as "OSVR"). The list of supported games is here.

Other categories include mobile headsets, which combine a smartphone with a mount, and hybrid solutions like the Oculus Quest with the Oculus Link feature that allows the standalone device to also serve as a tethered headset.

In addition, VR headsets are categorized by the degrees of freedom they provide:
3DoF: 3 degrees of freedom, where the viewer may turn around and choose where to look in the VR sphere;
6DoF: 6 degrees of freedom, where the viewer can move its position inside the VR environment.

Early VR

Tethered VR 

* Including price of VR touch peripherals.

Cancelled tethered VR headsets

Standalone VR (mobile device mounts and all-in-ones) 

** Not included in the headset.

Cancelled standalone devices

Upcoming devices 
The following devices have been announced but were not released yet, therefore provided information is subject to change.

Extensive comparison of popular PC-based devices

The following tables compare general and technical information for a selection of popular retail head-mounted displays. See the individual display's articles for further information. Please note that the following table may be missing some information.

Optics and audio

Tracking

Other information

VR support in game engines

References 

Computing comparisons
 Comparison